The Rocky  Horror Picture Show is a 1975 musical comedy horror film by 20th Century Fox, produced by Lou Adler and Michael White and directed by Jim Sharman. The screenplay was written by Sharman and actor Richard O'Brien, who is also a member of the cast. The film is based on the 1973 musical stage production The Rocky Horror Show, with music, book, and lyrics by O'Brien. The production is a tribute to the science fiction and horror B movies of the 1930s through to the early 1960s. Along with O'Brien, the film stars Tim Curry, Susan Sarandon, and Barry Bostwick and is narrated by Charles Gray, with cast members from the original Royal Court Theatre, Roxy Theatre, and Belasco Theatre productions, including Nell Campbell and Patricia Quinn.

The story centres on a young engaged couple whose car breaks down in the rain near a castle, where they seek a telephone to call for help. The castle or country home is occupied by strangers in elaborate costumes celebrating an annual convention. They discover the head of the house is Dr. Frank N. Furter, an apparently mad scientist who actually is an alien transvestite from the planet Transsexual in the galaxy of Transylvania, who creates a living muscle man named Rocky in his laboratory.

The film was shot in the United Kingdom at Bray Studios and on location at an old country estate named Oakley Court, best known for its earlier use by Hammer Film Productions. A number of props and set pieces were reused from the Hammer horror films. Although the film is both a parody of and tribute to many kitsch science fiction and horror films, costume designer Sue Blane conducted no research for her designs. Blane has claimed that her creations for the film directly affected the development of punk rock fashion trends, such as torn fishnet stockings and colourfully dyed hair.

Initial reception was extremely negative, but it soon became a hit as a midnight movie, when audiences began participating with the film at the Waverly Theater in New York City in 1976. Audience members returned to the cinemas frequently and talked back to the screen and began dressing as the characters, spawning similar performance groups across the United States. At almost the same time, fans in costume at the King's Court Theater in Pittsburgh began performing alongside the film. This "shadow cast" mimed the actions on screen above and behind them, while lip-synching their character's lines.

In many cities, live amateur shadow-casts act out the film as it is being shown and heavily draw upon a tradition of audience participation. The film is most often shown close to Halloween. Today, the film has a large international cult following and has been considered by many as one of the greatest musical films of all time. In 2005, it was selected for preservation in the United States National Film Registry by the Library of Congress as being "culturally, historically, or aesthetically significant."

Plot
The film begins with a pair of floating disembodied lips welcoming the audience to a science fiction double feature. Throughout the film, a criminologist from an unspecified point in the future narrates and provides commentary on the events.

Following the wedding of their friends, a naïve young couple, Brad Majors and Janet Weiss, get engaged and decide to celebrate with their high school science teacher Dr. Scott, who taught the class where they first met. En route to Scott's house on a dark and rainy night, they get lost with a flat tire. Seeking a telephone to call for help, the couple walk to a nearby castle where a party is being held. They are accepted in by the strangely dressed inhabitants, led by the butler Riff Raff, the maid Magenta, and a groupie named Columbia, who dance to "The Time Warp". Despite feeling apprehensive, they stay to meet the owner of the castle, Dr. Frank-N-Furter. He invites them to stay for the night.

With the help of Riff Raff, Frank brings to life a tall, muscular, handsome blond man named Rocky. As Frank vows he can improve Rocky into an ideal man in a week, a delivery boy named Eddie (half of whose brain Frank had used in the creation of Rocky) breaks out of a deep freeze riding a motorcycle. Frank kills Eddie with an ice axe, justifying it as a "mercy killing". Rocky and Frank depart for the bridal suite.

Brad and Janet are shown to separate bedrooms, where each is visited and seduced by Frank. Meanwhile, Riff Raff and his sister Magenta torment Rocky. Janet, upset and emotional, sees Brad smoking a cigarette in bed with Frank on a video monitor. She then discovers Rocky, cowering in his birth tank. While tending to his wounds, Janet seduces Rocky as Magenta and Columbia watch from their bedroom monitor.

Dr. Scott, now an investigator of UFOs for the government, arrives at the castle in search of his nephew Eddie, unaware of Brad and Janet's presence. Everyone discovers Janet and Rocky together, enraging Frank. At this point, Magenta summons everyone to an uncomfortable dinner, which they soon realize has been prepared from Eddie's mutilated remains. Columbia, Eddie's lover, flees from the room in tears. Janet runs screaming into Rocky's arms, provoking Frank to chase her through the halls to the lab.

Frank uses his Medusa Transducer to turn Dr. Scott, Brad, Janet, Rocky, and Columbia into nude statues. After dressing them in cabaret costumes, Frank "unfreezes" them, and they perform a live cabaret floor show, complete with an RKO tower and a swimming pool, with Frank as the leader. Riff Raff and Magenta interrupt the performance to declare mutiny; they disapprove of Frank's extreme lifestyle and are ready to return to Transylvania. Frank makes an impassioned plea to return with them, but Riff Raff kills him, as well as Columbia and Rocky. Riff Raff warns Brad, Janet, and Dr. Scott to leave immediately; the castle lifts off into space. The injured survivors are then left crawling in the smog and dirt and the criminologist concludes that the human race is equivalent to insects crawling on the planet's surface: "lost in time, and lost in space... and meaning".

Cast
 Tim Curry as Dr. Frank-N-Furter, a transvestite scientist 
 Susan Sarandon as Janet Weiss, Brad's fiancée
 Barry Bostwick as Brad Majors, Janet's fiancé
 Richard O'Brien as Riff Raff, a hunchbacked handyman and Magenta's brother
 Patricia Quinn as Magenta, a maid and Riff Raff's sister
 Little Nell as Columbia, a groupie
 Jonathan Adams as Dr. Everett V. Scott, Frank's rival scientist
 Peter Hinwood as Rocky Horror, Frank's creation
 Meat Loaf as Eddie, a former delivery boy
 Charles Gray as the criminologist, an expert

Production

Concept and development

Richard O'Brien was living as an unemployed actor in London during the early 1970s. He wrote most of The Rocky Horror Show during one winter just to occupy himself. Since his youth, O'Brien had loved science fiction and B horror movies. He wanted to combine elements of the unintentional humour of B horror movies, portentous dialogue of schlock-horror, Steve Reeves muscle flicks, and fifties rock and roll into his musical. O'Brien conceived and wrote the play set against the backdrop of the glam era that had manifested itself in British popular culture in the 1970s. Allowing his concept to come into being, O'Brien states "glam rock allowed me to be myself more".

O'Brien showed a portion of the unfinished script to Australian director Jim Sharman, who decided to direct it at the small experimental space Upstairs at the Royal Court Theatre in Sloane Square, Chelsea, London, which was used as a project space for new work. O'Brien had appeared briefly in a stage production of Andrew Lloyd Webber's Jesus Christ Superstar, directed by Sharman, and the two also worked together in Sam Shepard's The Unseen Hand. Sharman would bring in production designer Brian Thomson. The original creative team was then rounded out by costume designer Sue Blane, musical director Richard Hartley, and stage producer Michael White, who was brought in to produce. As the musical went into rehearsal, the working title, They Came from Denton High, was changed just before previews at the suggestion of Sharman to The Rocky Horror Show.

Having premiered in the small 60-seat Royal Court Theatre, it quickly moved to larger venues in London, transferring to the 230-seat Chelsea Classic Cinema on King's Road on 14 August 1973, before finding a quasi-permanent home at the 500-seat King's Road Theatre from 3 November that year, running for six years. The musical made its U.S. debut in Los Angeles in 1974 before playing in New York City as well as other cities. Producer and Ode Records owner Lou Adler attended the London production in the winter of 1973, escorted by friend Britt Ekland. He immediately decided to purchase the U.S. theatrical rights. His production would be staged at his Roxy Theatre in L.A. In 1975, The Rocky Horror Show premiered on Broadway at the 1,000-seat Belasco Theatre.

Filming and locations

Set in the fictional town of Denton, the film was shot at Bray Studios and Oakley Court, a country house near Maidenhead, Berkshire, England, and at Elstree Studios for post-production, from 21 October to 19 December 1974. Oakley Court, built in 1857 in the Victorian Gothic style, is known for a number of Hammer films. Much of the location shooting took place there, although at the time the manor was not in good condition. Most of the cast were from the original London stage production, including Tim Curry, who had decided that Dr Frank N. Furter should speak like the Queen of the United Kingdom, extravagantly posh. Fox insisted on casting the two characters of Brad and Janet with American actors, Barry Bostwick and Susan Sarandon. Filming took place during autumn, which made conditions worse. During filming, Sarandon fell ill with pneumonia. Filming of the laboratory scene and the title character's creation occurred on 30 October 1974.

The film is both a parody and tribute to many of the science fiction and horror movies from the 1930s up to the 1970s. The film production retains many aspects from the stage version, such as production design and music, but adds new scenes not featured in the original stage play. The film's plot, setting, and style echo those of the Hammer horror films, which had their own instantly recognizable style (just as Universal Studios' horror films did). The originally proposed opening sequence was to contain clips of various films mentioned in the lyrics, as well as the first few sequences shot in black and white, but this was deemed too expensive and scrapped.

Costumes, make-up, and props
In the stage productions, actors generally did their own make-up; however, for the film, the producers chose Pierre La Roche, who had previously been a make-up artist for Mick Jagger and David Bowie, to redesign the make-up for each character. Production stills were taken by rock photographer Mick Rock, who has published a number of books from his work. In Rocky Horror: From Concept to Cult, designer Sue Blane discusses the Rocky Horror costumes' influence on punk music style, opining "[It was a] big part of the build-up [to punk]." She states that ripped fishnet stockings, glitter, and coloured hair were directly attributable to Rocky Horror.

Some of the costumes from the film had been originally used in the stage production. Props and set pieces were reused from old Hammer Horror productions and others. The tank and dummy used for Rocky's birth originally appeared in The Revenge of Frankenstein (1958). These references to earlier productions, in addition to cutting costs, enhanced the cult status of the film.

Costume designer Sue Blane was not keen on working for the film, until she became aware that Curry, an old friend, was committed to the project. Curry and Blane had worked together in Glasgow's Citizens Theatre in a production of The Maids, for which Curry had worn a woman's corset. Blane arranged for the theatre to loan her the corset from the other production for Rocky Horror. Blane admits that she did not conduct research for her designing, had never seen a science fiction film, and is acutely aware that her costumes for Brad and Janet may have been generalizations.

The budget for the film was US$1,600,000, far more than the stage production budget, but having to double up on costumes for the film production was expensive. For filming, corsets for the finale had to be doubled for the pool scene, with one version drying while the other was worn on set. While many of the costumes are exact replicas from the stage productions, other costumes were new to filming, such as Columbia's gold sequined swallow-tail coat and top hat and Magenta's maid's uniform.

Blane was amazed by the recreation and understanding of her designs by fans. When she first heard that people were dressing up, she thought it would be tacky, but was surprised to see the depth to which the fans went to recreate her designs. Rocky Horror fan Mina Credeur, who designs costumes and performed as Columbia for Houston's performance group, states that "the best part is when everyone leaves with a big smile on their face," noting that there's "such a kitschiness and campiness that it seems to be winking at you." The film still plays at many theatre locations and Rocky Horror costumes are often made for Halloween, although many require much time and effort to make.

Title sequence
The film starts with the screen fading to black and oversized, disembodied female lips appear overdubbed with a male voice, establishing the theme of androgyny to be repeated as the film unfolds. The opening scene and song, "Science Fiction/Double Feature", consists of the lips of Patricia Quinn (who appears in the film later as the character Magenta and as 'Trixie the Usherette' in the original London production, where she also sings the song) but has the vocals of actor and Rocky Horror creator, Richard O'Brien (who appears as Magenta's brother Riff Raff). The lyrics refer to science fiction and horror films of the past and list several film titles from the 1930s to the 1960s, including The Day the Earth Stood Still (1951), Flash Gordon (1936), The Invisible Man (1933), King Kong (1933), It Came from Outer Space (1953), Doctor X (1932), Forbidden Planet (1956), Tarantula (1955), The Day of the Triffids (1962), Curse of the Demon (1957), and When Worlds Collide (1951).

Music

The soundtrack was released in 1975 by Ode Records and produced by English composer Richard Hartley. The album peaked at No. 49 on the U.S. Billboard 200 in 1978. It reached No. 12 on the Australian albums chart and No. 11 on the New Zealand albums chart. The album is described as the "definitive version of the [Rocky Horror] score".

 "Science Fiction/Double Feature" – The Lips (those of Patricia Quinn; voice of Richard O'Brien)
 "Dammit Janet" – Brad, Janet, and Chorus
 "Over at the Frankenstein Place" – Janet, Brad, Riff Raff, and Chorus
 "The Time Warp" – Riff Raff, Magenta, The Criminologist, Columbia, and Transylvanians
 "Sweet Transvestite" – Frank with spoken lyrics by Brad and Janet
 "The Sword of Damocles" – Rocky and Transylvanians
 "I Can Make You a Man" – Frank with Brad, Janet, Riff Raff, Magenta, and Columbia
 "Hot Patootie – Bless My Soul" – Eddie and Transylvanians
 "I Can Make You a Man (Reprise)" – Frank, Janet, and Transylvanians
 "Touch-a, Touch-a, Touch-a, Touch Me" – Janet with Magenta, Columbia, Rocky, Brad, Frank, and Riff Raff
 "Once in a While" (deleted scene) – Brad
 "Eddie" – Dr. Scott, The Criminologist, Janet, Columbia, Frank, Rocky, Brad, Riff Raff, and Magenta
 "Planet Schmanet Janet (Wise Up Janet Weiss)" – Frank with one line by Janet
 "Planet Hot Dog" – Frank, Brad, Dr. Scott, and Janet
 "Rose Tint My World" – Columbia, Rocky, Janet, and Brad
 "Fanfare/Don't Dream It, Be It" – Frank with Brad, Janet, Rocky, and Columbia
 "Wild and Untamed Thing" – Frank with Brad, Janet, Rocky, Columbia, and Riff Raff
 "I'm Going Home" – Frank and Chorus
 "Super Heroes" (only present in full in the original UK release) – Brad, Janet, The Criminologist, and Chorus
 "Science Fiction/Double Feature (Reprise)" – The Lips

Release

The film opened in the United Kingdom at the Rialto Theatre in London on 14 August 1975 and in the United States on 26 September at the UA Westwood in Los Angeles. It did well at that location, but not elsewhere.  Before the midnight screenings' success, the film was withdrawn from its eight opening cities due to very small audiences, and its planned New York City opening on Halloween night was cancelled. Fox re-released the film around college campuses on a double-bill with another rock music film parody, Brian De Palma's Phantom of the Paradise (1974), but again it drew small audiences.

A second film poster was created using a set of red lipstick-painted lips with the tagline "A Different Set of Jaws", a spoof of the poster for the film Jaws (which was also released in 1975). The lips of former Playboy model Lorelei Shark are featured on the poster.

With Pink Flamingos (1972) and Reefer Madness (1936) making money in midnight showings nationwide, a Fox executive, Tim Deegan, was able to talk distributors into midnight screenings, starting in New York City on April Fools' Day of 1976. It was the "Secret" film, on 20 May, in the first Seattle International Film Festival. The cult following started shortly after the film began its midnight run at the Waverly Theater in New York City, then spread to other counties in New York, and to Uniondale, Long Island. Rocky Horror was not only found in the larger cities but throughout the United States, where many attendees would get in free if they arrived in costume. The western division of the film's release included the U.A. Cinemas in Fresno and Merced, the Cinema J. in Sacramento, the UC Theatre in Berkeley and the Covell in Modesto. In New Orleans, an early organised performance group was active with the release there, as well as in such cities as Pittsburgh, Pennsylvania, and Chicago (at the Biograph Theater). Before long, nearly every screening of the film was accompanied by a live fan cast.

The Rocky Horror Picture Show is considered to be the longest-running release in film history. It benefited from a 20th Century Fox policy that made archival films available to theatres at any time. Having never been pulled by 20th Century Fox from its original 1975 release, it continues to play in cinemas. After The Walt Disney Company acquired 20th Century Fox in 2019 and began withdrawing archival Fox movies from theatres to be placed into the Disney Vault, the company made an exception in the case of The Rocky Horror Picture Show to allow the traditional midnight screenings to continue.

Home media
A Super 8 version of selected scenes of the film was made available. In 1983, Ode Records released "The Rocky Horror Picture Show, Audience Par-Tic-I-Pation Album", recorded at the 8th Street Playhouse. The recording consisted of the film's audio and the standardized call-backs from the audience.

A home video release was made available in 1987 in the UK. In the US, the film (including documentary footage and extras) was released on VHS on 8 November 1990, retailing for $89.95.

The film was released on DVD in 2000 for the film's 25th anniversary. A 35th anniversary edition Blu-ray was released by 20th Century Fox Home Entertainment in the US on 19 October 2010. The disc includes a newly created 7.1 surround sound mix, the original theatrical mono sound mix, and a 4K/2K image transfer from the original camera negative. In addition, new content featuring karaoke and a fan performance were included. A 45th anniversary edition Blu-ray was released in September 2020 by Walt Disney Studios Home Entertainment.

In October 2021, the film was added to Disney+ on the Star hub for users in locations such as the UK, Ireland and Canada.

Reception

Chicago Sun-Times critic Roger Ebert noted that when first released, The Rocky Horror Picture Show was "ignored by pretty much everyone, including the future fanatics who would eventually count the hundreds of times they'd seen it". He considered it more a "long-running social phenomenon" than a movie, rating it 2.5 out of 4 stars and describing Curry as "the best thing in the movie, maybe because he seems to be having the most fun" but thinking the story would work better performed on stage for a live audience. Bill Henkin noted that Variety thought that the "campy hijinks" of the film seemed labored, and also mentioned that the San Francisco Chronicle John Wasserman, who had liked the stage play in London, found the film "lacking both charm and dramatic impact". Newsweek, in 1978, called the film "tasteless, plotless and pointless".

Review aggregator website Rotten Tomatoes gives the film a rating of 79% based on 47 reviews, and an average grade of 6.9/10, with the critical consensus reading "The Rocky Horror Picture Show brings its quirky characters in tight, but it's the narrative thrust that really drives audiences insane and keeps 'em doing the time warp again". A number of contemporary critics find it compelling and enjoyable because of its offbeat and bizarre qualities; the BBC summarised: "for those willing to experiment with something a little bit different, a little bit outré, The Rocky Horror Picture Show has a lot to offer." The New York Times called it a "low-budget freak show/cult classic/cultural institution" with "catchy" songs. Geoff Andrew, of Time Out, noted that the "string of hummable songs gives it momentum, Gray's admirably straight-faced narrator holds it together, and a run on black lingerie takes care of almost everything else", rating it 4 out of 5 stars. On the other hand, Dave Kehr of the Chicago Reader considered the wit to be "too weak to sustain a film" and thought that the "songs all sound the same".

In 2005, the film was selected for preservation in the United States National Film Registry by the Library of Congress as being "culturally, historically, or aesthetically significant".

Cult following

Origins

The Rocky Horror Picture Show helped shape conditions of cult film's transition from art-house to grind-house style. The film developed a cult following in 1976 at the Waverly Theatre in New York, which developed into a standardized ritual. According to J. Hoberman, author of Midnight Movies, it was after five months into the film's midnight run when lines began to be shouted by the audience. Louis Farese Jr., a normally quiet teacher, upon seeing the character Janet place a newspaper over her head to protect herself from rain, yelled, "Buy an umbrella, you cheap bitch." Originally, Louis and other Rocky Horror pioneers, including Amy Lazarus, Theresa Krakauskas, and Bill O'Brian, did this to entertain each other, each week trying to come up with something new to make each other laugh. This quickly caught on with other theatre-goers and thus began this self-proclaimed "counter point dialogue", which became standard practice and was repeated nearly verbatim at each screening. Performance groups became a staple at Rocky Horror screenings due in part to the prominent New York City fan cast. The New York City cast was originally run by former schoolteacher and stand-up comic Sal Piro and his friend Dori Hartley, the latter of whom portrayed Dr. Frank N. Furter and was one of several performers, including Will Kohler as Brad Majors, Nora Poses as Janet, and Lilias Piro as Magenta, in a flexible rotating cast. The performances of the audience were scripted and actively discouraged improvising, being conformist in a similar way to the repressed characters.

On Halloween in 1976, people attended in costume and talked back to the screen, and by mid-1978, Rocky Horror was playing in over 50 locations on Fridays and Saturdays at midnight. Newsletters were published by local performance groups, and fans gathered for Rocky Horror conventions. By the end of 1979, there were twice-weekly showings at over 230 theatres. The National Fan Club was established in 1977 and later merged with the International Fan Club. The fan publication The Transylvanian printed a number of issues, and a semi-regular poster magazine was published as well as an official magazine.

Performance groups in the Los Angeles area originated at the Fox Theatre in 1977, where Michael Wolfson won a look-alike contest as Frank N. Furter, and won another at the Tiffany Theater on Sunset Boulevard. Wolfson's group eventually performed in all of the L.A. area theatres screening Rocky Horror, including the Balboa Theater in Balboa, The Cove at Hermosa Beach, and The Sands in Glendale. He was invited to perform at the Sombrero Playhouse in Phoenix, Arizona. At the Tiffany Theatre, the audience performance cast had the theatre's full cooperation; the local performers entered early and without charge. The fan playing Frank for this theatre was a transgender performer, D. Garret Gafford, who was out of work in 1978 and trying to raise the funds for a gender reassignment while spending the weekends performing at the Tiffany. Presently, the live action rendition of The Rocky Horror Picture Show is available for attendance in various locations in Los Angeles, typically Saturday nights at midnight.

By 1978, Rocky Horror had moved from an earlier San Francisco location to the Strand Theatre located near the Tenderloin on Market Street. The performance group there, Double Feature/Celluloid Jam, was the first to act out and perform almost the entire film, unlike the New York cast at that time. The Strand cast was put together from former members of an early Berkeley group, disbanded due to less than enthusiastic management. Frank N. Furter was portrayed by Marni Scofidio, who, in 1979, attracted many of the older performers from Berkeley. Other members included Mishell Erickson as Columbia, her twin sister Denise Erickson as Magenta, Kathy Dolan as Janet, and Linda "Lou" Woods as Riff Raff. The Strand group performed at two large science fiction conventions in Los Angeles and San Francisco, were offered a spot at The Mabuhay, a local punk club, and performed for children's television of Argentina.

Legacy

Annual Rocky Horror conventions are held in varying locations, lasting days. Tucson, Arizona has been host a number of times, including 1999 with "El Fishnet Fiesta", and "Queens of the Desert" held in 2006. Vera Dika wrote that, to the fans, Rocky Horror is ritualistic and comparable to a religious event, with a compulsive, repeated cycle of going home and coming back to see the film each weekend. The audience call-backs are similar to responses in church during a mass. Many theatre troupes exist across the United States that produce shadow-cast performances where the actors play each part in the film in full costume, with props, as the movie plays on the big screen in a movie theatre. O'Brien's Orchestra, formerly known as the Queerios (based in Austin, Texas), is the longest running shadow-cast in Texas.

The film has a global following and remains popular. Subcultures such as Rocky Horror have also found a place on the Internet. Audience participation scripts for many cities are available for download from the internet. The internet has a number of Rocky Horror fan-run websites with various quizzes and information, specializing in different content, allowing fans to participate at a unique level.

LGBT influence

Members of the LGBT community comprised a large part of the Rocky Horror cult following: they identified with the embrace of sexual liberation and androgyny, and attended show after show, slowly forming a community. Judith A. Peraino compares Brad and Janet's initiation into Frank N. Furter's world to the self-discovery of 'queer identity', and to the traditional initiation of 'virgins' in the shadow screenings. June Thomas describes the midnight screenings in Delaware as a 'very queer scene,' which increased visibility for the LGBT community: "The folks standing in line outside the State in fishnets and makeup every Saturday night undoubtedly widened the sphere of possibilities for gender expression on Main Street."

The Rocky Horror Picture Show remains a cultural phenomenon in both the U.S. and U.K. Cult film participants are often people on the fringe of society that find connection and community at the screenings, although the film attracts fans of differing backgrounds all over the world.

"Bisexuality, The Rocky Horror Picture Show, and Me", by Elizabeth Reba Weise, is part of the publication, Bi Any Other Name: Bisexual People Speak Out (1991), an anthology edited by Loraine Hutchins and Lani Kaʻahumanu about the history of the modern bisexual rights movement that is one of the first publications of bisexual literature.

Cultural influence

The Rocky Horror Picture Show has been featured in a number of other feature films and television series over the years. Episodes of The Simpsons, The Venture Bros., Tuca & Bertie, The Boondocks, Glee, The Drew Carey Show, That '70s Show, Deutschland 86, and American Dad! spotlight Rocky Horror, as do films such as Vice Squad (1982), Halloween II (2009), and The Perks of Being a Wallflower (2012). The 1980 film Fame featured the audience reciting their callback lines to the screen and dancing the Time Warp, the dance from the stage show and film, which has become a novelty dance at parties. Director Rob Zombie cited Rocky Horror as a major influence on his film House of 1000 Corpses (2003), while the film's fan culture of cosplaying and audience participation during screenings laid the groundwork for the similarly influential cult following surrounding Tommy Wiseau's The Room (2003). Rocky Horror also inspired John McPhail's zombie musical Anna and the Apocalypse (2018).

Sequel
In 1979, O'Brien wrote a projected sequel to the film titled Rocky Horror Shows His Heels. This script would have featured the return of all of the characters from the original film, and O'Brien wished to largely use the original production team to make the new film; however, Sharman did not wish to revisit the original concept so directly, and Tim Curry did not wish to reprise his role.

Instead, in 1981, Sharman reunited with O'Brien to film Shock Treatment, a stand-alone feature that was not a direct sequel to the original film. This film was originally conceived and written in 1980 under the title The Brad and Janet Show, using most of the songs from the original project Rocky Horror Shows His Heels with lyrical adjustments, and depicting the characters' continuing adventures in the town of Denton; however, these plans had to be adjusted due to a Screen Actors Guild strike. The eventual production would entail the entire film being shot within a sound stage. Shock Treatment was poorly received by critics and audiences upon release (in no small part due to the principal cast of Curry, Sarandon and Bostwick not returning) but over time has built a small cult following, though not nearly as strong as the first film.

Ten years later, O'Brien wrote another script intended as a direct sequel to the cult classic, entitled Revenge of the Old Queen. Producer Michael White had hoped to begin work on the production and described the script as being "in the same style as the other one. It has reflections of the past in it." Revenge of the Old Queen had apparently commenced pre-production; however, after studio head Joe Roth was ousted from Fox in 1993, the project was shelved indefinitely. Although the script has not been published, bootleg copies can be read on the internet, and one song from the project's original demo tape circulates among fans. The script is currently owned by Fox, which produced the two original films. Most individuals associated with the project, including O'Brien, agree that the film will probably never be made, owing to the failure of Shock Treatment and the aging of the original cast.

Between 1999 and 2001, O'Brien was working on a third attempted sequel project with the working title Rocky Horror: The Second Coming, first to be made as a stage production, with an option to create a film if met with success. This script would largely integrate plot elements from Rocky Horror Shows His Heels, but with all-new songs. O'Brien completed a first draft of this script (which was read by Terry Jones) but had difficulties finalising anything beyond the first act, and little more has been heard of this project since the mid-2000s.

In spring 2015, O'Brien produced Shock Treatment for the theatrical stage with a premiere at the King's Head Theatre in Islington, London.

Remake

"The Rocky Horror Glee Show" aired on 26 October 2010, as part of the second season of the television series Glee—and recreated several scenes from the film, including the opening credits. It featured Barry Bostwick and Meat Loaf in cameo roles. An EP album covering seven songs from the movie was released on 19 October 2010.

On 10 April 2015, the Fox Network announced it would air a modern-day reimagining of the film, titled The Rocky Horror Picture Show: Let's Do the Time Warp Again. On 22 October 2015, Fox announced that the role of Dr. Frank N. Furter would be played by transgender actress Laverne Cox. Ryan McCartan played Brad, alongside Victoria Justice as Janet, with Reeve Carney as Riff Raff and singer/model Staz Nair as Rocky. Adam Lambert portrays Eddie. Tim Curry, who portrayed Dr. Frank N. Furter in the original film, portrays the Criminologist. On 1 February 2016, the network announced that Broadway veteran Annaleigh Ashford would portray Columbia. On 5 February 2016, Ben Vereen joined the cast as Dr. Everett von Scott.

Kenny Ortega, best known for the High School Musical franchise and Michael Jackson's This Is It (2009) directed, choreographed and executive-produced the remake; Lou Adler, who was an executive producer of the original film, has the same role for the new film, which premiered on Fox on 20 October 2016.

See also
 List of American films of 1975
 List of British films of 1975
 Cross-dressing in film and television
 List of films featuring extraterrestrials
 List of films featuring Frankenstein's monster

References

Bibliography

External links

 
 
 
 
 
 
 
 
  — official trailer

Rocky Horror
1975 films
1975 comedy films
1975 LGBT-related films
1975 horror films
1970s American films
1970s British films
1970s comedy horror films
1970s dance films
1970s English-language films
1970s exploitation films
1970s musical comedy films
1970s science fiction comedy films
1970s science fiction horror films
1970s screwball comedy films
20th Century Fox films
Alien visitations in films
American comedy horror films
American dance films
American exploitation films
American LGBT-related films
American musical comedy films
American rock musicals
American science fiction comedy films
American science fiction horror films
British comedy horror films
British dance films
British exploitation films
British LGBT-related films
British musical comedy films
British science fiction comedy films
British science fiction horror films
Cross-dressing in American films
Cross-dressing in British films
Films about cannibalism
Films adapted into comics
Films based on musicals
Films directed by Jim Sharman
Films set in 1974
Films set in country houses
Films shot at Bray Studios
Films shot at EMI-Elstree Studios
Incest in film
LGBT-related comedy horror films
LGBT-related musical comedy films
LGBT-related science fiction comedy films
LGBT-related science fiction horror films
Mad scientist films
Mannequins in films
Parodies of horror
Punk films
Rock musicals
Science fiction musical films
Transgender-related films
United States National Film Registry films